Coriolano Vighi (1846-1905) was an Italian painter, mainly of landscapes.

He was born in Florence, resident in Bologna. In 1880 at Turin, he exhibited: Interval of Rain. The next year in Milan, he exhibited Dai verdi, Lungo un fiume, Era il Giugno, and Crepuscolo. In 1884 at Turin, he exhibited: Countryside mesta and Pace ignorata; and in 1888 at Bologna, he exhibited: L'avvicinarsi della procella, a pastel work.

References

1846 births
1905 deaths
19th-century Italian painters
Italian male painters
20th-century Italian painters
20th-century Italian male artists
Italian landscape painters
19th-century Italian male artists